Council of Latvian women's organizations (Latviesu Sieviesu Organizāciju Padome)  was a Latvian women's rights organization, founded in 1925.

It was an umbrella organization and united most of the women's organizations in Latvia during the interwar period; the National League of Latvian Women (1922), Assistant Corps of Latvian Women (1919), YWCA Young women's Christian Association, the Association of Academically Educated Latvian Women (1928), the Association of Latvian Theologians, the society «State Employee» and other women's associations.

It played a major part in interwar Latvian feminism, and campaigned to improve woman's position in family, work, society and state. It published a monthly, «Latvian Woman».

References

 https://prod-cdn.atria.nl/wp-content/uploads/sites/2/2019/01/22101033/LIEL-19920001.pdf
 Francisca de Haan, Krasimira Daskalova, Anna Loutfi, Biographical Dictionary of Women's Movements and Feminisms in Central 
 Blanca Rodriguez Ruiz, Ruth Rubio-Marín, The Struggle for Female Suffrage in Europe: Voting to Become Citizens
 Kevin Passmore, Women, Gender, and Fascism in Europe, 1919-45
 Ann T. Allen, Women in Twentieth-Century Europe
 Björn M. Felder, Paul J. Weindling, Baltic Eugenics: Bio-Politics, Race and Nation in Interwar Estonia, Latvia 

Organizations established in 1925
1925 establishments in Latvia
1940 disestablishments in Latvia
Organizations disestablished in 1940
Women's organisations based in Latvia